The Gospel of Philip is a non-canonical Gnostic Gospel dated to around the 3rd century but lost in medieval times until rediscovered by accident, buried with other texts near Nag Hammadi in Egypt, in 1945.

The text is not closely related to the canonical gospels and is not accepted as canonical by the Christian church. Although it may have some relationship to the beliefs expressed in the Gospel of Thomas, scholars are divided as to whether it should be read as a single discourse or as a collection of otherwise unrelated Valentinian sayings. Sacraments, in particular the sacrament of marriage, are a major theme. As in other texts often associated with what has been referred to as "Gnosticism," such as the Gospel of Thomas and Gospel of Mary, the Gospel of Philip defends a tradition that gives Mary Magdalene a special relationship and insight into Jesus' teaching.

Date of composition 

The gospel's title appears at the end of the Coptic manuscript in a colophon; the only connection with Philip the Apostle within the text is that he is the only apostle mentioned (at 73,8). The text proper makes no claim to be from Philip, though the four New Testament gospels make no explicit internal claim of authorship either. Most scholars hold a 3rd-century date of composition.

History and context 
A single manuscript of the Gospel of Philip, in Coptic (CG II), was found in the Nag Hammadi library, a cache of documents that was secreted in a jar and buried in the Egyptian desert at the end of the 4th century. The text was bound in the same codex that contained the better-known Gospel of Thomas.

From the mix of aphorisms, parables, brief polemics, narrative dialogue, biblical exegesis (especially of Genesis), and dogmatic propositions, Wesley W. Isenberg, the editor and translator of the text, has attributed seventeen sayings (logia) to Jesus, nine of which  characterizes as citations and interpretations of those found in the canonical gospels The new sayings, "identified by the formula introducing them ('he said', 'the Lord said', or 'the Saviour said') are brief and enigmatic and are best interpreted from a gnostic perspective.

Much of the Gospel of Philip is concerned with Gnostic views of the origin and nature of mankind and the sacraments it refers to as baptism, unction and marriage. It is not always clear whether these are the same literal rituals known in other parts of the early Christian movement and since, or ideal and heavenly realities. The Gospel emphasizes the sacramental nature of the embrace between man and woman (or ideas represented by these as types) in the "nuptial chamber," which is an archetype of spiritual unity. Many of the sayings are identifiably related to other texts referred to by scholars as Gnostic, and often appear quite mysterious and enigmatic (these are from the translation by ):

One saying in particular appears to identify the levels of initiation in gnosticism, although what exactly the bridal chamber represented in gnostic thought is a matter of debate:

One possibility is that the bridal chamber refers symbolically to the relationship of trust and singular devotion that should exist between God (bridegroom) and humankind or believer (bride) – just as the marriage relationship (bedchamber) implies a devotion of husband and wife to each other that is expected to exclude all other parties. This symbolic meaning is found for example in the Parable of the Ten Virgins – , "Then shall the kingdom of heaven be likened unto ten virgins, which took their lamps, and went forth to meet the bridegroom".

Another interpretation of the Gospel of Philip supported by scholar Marvin W. Meyer, emphasizes Jesus as central focus of the text. Some quotations from the gospel could be inferred as placing Jesus in a central position:

According to Meyer, without Jesus, the rituals and mysteries mentioned in this gospel would have no context. 

Furthermore this text seems to be related to others connected with the Valentinian Christian sect, who worshipped a Christ interpreted through "gnostic" ideas, and is often linked to what is sometimes thought to be Valentinius' own composition, the Gospel of Truth.

The Gospel of Philip ends with its promise:

Mary Magdalene 
Much of the Gospel of Philip is dedicated to a discussion of marriage as a sacred mystery, and two passages directly refer to Mary Magdalene and her close relationship with Jesus:

In different places in the Gospel of Philip, Mary Magdalene is called Jesus's companion, partner or consort, using Coptic variants of the word koinōnos (κοινωνός), of Greek origin, or the word hōtre, of Egyptian origin. In this passage koinōnos is used. Koinōnos has a range of possible meanings: at root, it denotes a "person engaged in fellowship or sharing with someone or in something", but what exactly a koinōnos "can share with his or her partner can take many forms, ranging from a common enterprise or experience to a shared business". In the Bible, koinōnos is sometimes used to refer to a spouse (cf. ), but is also used to refer to a "companion" in faith, a co-worker in proclaiming the Gospel, or a business associate. The Gospel of Philip uses cognates of koinōnos and Coptic equivalents to refer to the literal pairing of men and women in marriage and sexual intercourse, but also metaphorically, referring to a spiritual partnership, and the reunification of the Gnostic Christian with the divine realm. And importantly, there are occasions in the Gospel of Philip when the regular Coptic word for wife is used directly in reference to people who are clearly spouses, suggesting that the term koinônos is "reserved for a more specific usage" in the Gospel of Philip.

That passage is also interesting for its mention of Jesus's sister (Jesus's unnamed sisters are mentioned in the New Testament at ), although the text is confusing on that point: she appears to be described first as the sister of Jesus's mother Mary (also mentioned in the Gospel of John, possibly the same person as Mary of Clopas), then as the sister of Jesus, although this may be a translation problem.

The other passage, purportedly referring to Jesus kissing Mary Magdalene, is incomplete because of damage to the original manuscript. Several words are missing. Guesses as to what they were are shown below in brackets. Most notably there is a hole in the manuscript after the phrase "and used to kiss her [often] on her...." But the passage appears to describe Jesus kissing Magdalene, apparently described as "barren" and "the mother of the angels" at the beginning of the relevant paragraph and using a parable to explain to the disciples why he loved her more than he loved them:

Some scholars speculate that "hand" is the word after "kiss her... on her". But it may have been cheek, forehead or feet to simply show respect.  translates it as "on her mouth".

Problems concerning the text 
The Gospel of Philip is a text that reveals some connections with Early Christian writings of the Gnostic traditions. It is a series of logia or aphoristic utterances, most of them apparently quotations and excerpts of lost writings, without any attempt at a narrative context. The main theme concerns the value of sacraments. Scholars debate whether the original language was Syriac or Greek. Wesley W. Isenberg, the text's translator, places the date "perhaps as late as the 2nd half of the 3rd century" and places its probable origin in Syria due to its references to Syriac words and eastern baptismal practices as well as its ascetic outlook. The online Early Christian Writings site gives it a date c. 180–250. Meyer gives its date as "2nd or 3rd century".

Interpretation 
Bentley Layton identified it as a Valentinian anthology of excerpts, and Elaine Pagels and Martha Lee Turner have seen it as possessing a consistent and Valentinian theology. It is dismissed by Catholic author Ian Wilson who argues that it "has no special claim to an early date, and seems to be merely a Mills and Boon-style fantasy of a type not uncommon among Christian apocryphal literature of the 3rd and 4th centuries".

Latter-Day Saint (Mormon) scholar Richard O. Cowan sees a parallel between the "bridal chamber" that is a central theme in the Gospel and the Mormon doctrine of "the new and everlasting covenant of marriage", or "eternal marriage".

See also
List of Gospels

Notes

References

Further reading

External links 

 Wesley W. Isenberg, translator, Gospel of Philip
 , with hyperlinear translation linked to Crum's Coptic Dictionary and Plumley's Coptic Grammar (which unfortunately consistently misspells "through"). Ecumenical Coptic Project online edition, 1998 ff.
 Early Christian writings: Gospel of Philip brief introductions and e-texts

3rd-century Christian texts
Apocryphal collections of logia
Coptic literature
Gnostic Gospels
Nag Hammadi library
Valentinian texts